Caroline Jane Voaden is a British politician and international journalist, who served as leader of the Liberal Democrats in the European Parliament from 2019 to 2020, and was a Member of the European Parliament (MEP) for the South West England and Gibraltar constituency from 2019 to 2020. 

Voaden has covered six European countries in her capacity as a journalist.  Whilst covering the latter years of the Yugoslav Wars in Zagreb, she made history as the youngest female bureau chief at Reuters.

Personal life
Caroline was born in Wantage in Berkshire (now Oxfordshire), on 22 November 1968, and grew up in Scotland. She later moved to Sheffield to study French and Economics, with a year abroad living in Lille.

She now lives in Devon with her two daughters, husband and step-son, following her being widowed at 34.

Professional career
From 1991 to 2000, Voaden worked for the Reuters news agency, undergoing assignments in Amsterdam, Dublin, Bonn, Belgrade and Zagreb.

In 2007, she moved to Devon, where she founded her own modern craft brand in 2012. In 2018 she became operations manager at a resettlement charity working with offenders and prisoners from HM Prison Channings Wood. 

Voaden was chair of the national WAY Foundation from 2009 to 2011, a charity that supports men and women widowed under the age of 50.

From 2000 to 2007, she served in the team which established JustGiving, as an online editor for the charitable social platform.

She is the chief executive of Devon Rape Crisis & Sexual Abuse Services.

Political career
Voaden joined the Liberal Democrats the day after the Brexit referendum in 2016, seeking to oppose Brexit and campaign for a second referendum on EU membership.

She stood against Gary Streeter as the Liberal Democrat candidate for the  constituency in the 2017 General Election, coming third with 5.2% of the vote.

European Parliament
In 2019, Voaden was elected as Member of the European Parliament for the South West of England constituency, having campaigned on a platform of stopping Brexit and fighting climate change.

She sat as a full member of the European Parliament Committee on the Environment, Public Health and Food Safety, a substitute member of the Committee on Transport and Tourism and the Vice-President of the European Parliament's delegation for relations with the Arabian Peninsula.

Following criticism of BBC television's Question Time for having never featured a pro-Remain MEP, Voaden was the first pro-European MEP to feature, in October 2019.

In November 2019, Catherine Bearder announced that she would be stepping down as the leader of the Liberal Democrats in the European Parliament. Voaden was subsequently elected as the leader of the European party.

She was a member of the Renew Europe group in the European Parliament. Her name was removed after Brexit.

References

External links 

 Caroline Voaden on Facebook
 Caroline Voaden on Twitter

1968 births
Living people
Liberal Democrats (UK) MEPs
Liberal Democrats (UK) parliamentary candidates
MEPs for England 2019–2020
21st-century women MEPs for England
British journalists
British women journalists
Reuters people
People from Wantage
Politicians from Devon